The 2017 Townsville Blackhawks season was the third in the club's history. Coached by Kristian Woolf and captained by Daniel Beasley, they competed in the Intrust Super Cup and finished 6th, being eliminated in the first week of the finals.

Season summary

Milestones
 Round 1: Carlin Anderson, Paul Byrnes, Ty Carucci, Shaun Fensom, Lee Jewitt, Blake Leary, Sione Lousi, Kierran Moseley, Temone Power and Oshae Tuiasau made their debuts for the club.
 Round 1: Carlin Anderson and Ty Carucci scored their first tries for the club.
 Round 2: Anthony Mitchell played his 50th game for the club.
 Round 2: Josh Hall made his debut for the club.
 Round 2: Josh Hall scored his first try for the club.
 Round 3: Ross Bella made his debut for the club.
 Round 3: Blake Leary and Kierran Moseley scored their first tries for the club.
 Round 4: Jordan Kenworthy made his debut for the club.
 Round 6: Temone Power and Jordan Kenworthy scored their first tries for the club.
 Round 7: Oshae Tuiasau scored his first try for the club.
 Round 10: Michael Parker-Walshe played his 50 game for the club.
 Round 12: The club suffered their biggest ever loss (to PNG Hunters 42-4).
 Round 13: Corey Jensen played his 50th game for the club.
 Round 14: Halvor Harris and Tremayne Bowie made their debuts for the club.
 Round 16: Jordan Drew made his debut for the club.
 Round 16: Jordan Drew scored his first try for the club.
 Round 16: Jonathon Reuben scored his 50th try for the club.
 Round 19: Francis Molo made his debut for the club.
 Round 21: Paul Byrnes scored his first try for the club.
 Round 25: Jonathon Reuben played his 50th game for the club.

2017 squad

Squad movement

Gains

Losses

Fixtures

Pre-season

Regular season

Finals

Statistics

Honours

Club
Player of the Year: Blake Leary
Players' Player: Anthony Mitchell
Back of the Year: Jonathon Reuben
Forward of the Year: Blake Leary
Under 20 Player of the Year: Brenn Foster
Under 18 Player of the Year: Enemarki Shibasaki

League
Top Point Scorer: Carlin Anderson
Top Try Scorer: Jonathon Reuben
Winger of the Year: Jonathon Reuben
Second Rower of the Year: Blake Leary

References

2017 in Australian rugby league
2017 in rugby league by club
Townsville Blackhawks